Yabuki (矢吹 "blow arrow") is a Japanese surname and place name. It may refer to:

People
Haruna Yabuki (born 1984), Japanese gravure idol
Kentaro Yabuki (born 1980), Japanese manga artist
Kimio Yabuki, Japanese animator
Sen Katayama (1859–1933), born Yabuki Sugataro, early member of the American Communist Party and co-founder of the Japan Communist Party
Nako Yabuki (born 2001), Japanese singer and actress

Characters
Joe Yabuki, the main character from the manga/anime series Ashita no Joe
Jun Yabuki, a character from the Tokusatsu TV series Choudenshi Bioman
Mika and Takeshi Yabuki, characters from the manga series Futari Ecchi
Shingo Yabuki, a character from the video game series, King of Fighters

Other
Yabuki, Fukushima, Nishishirakawa District, Fukushima, Japan
5192 Yabuki, an outer main-belt asteroid